E. Allan Wendt (born 1935) is an American diplomat. He was the first United States Ambassador to Slovenia from 1993 to 1995.

Biography
Wendt was born in 1935 in Illinois. He later joined the U.S. Foreign Service. On January 31, 1968, he was the duty officer serving at the U.S. Embassy in Saigon, South Vietnam, when it was attacked by Vietcong guerrillas. 

On August 25, 1992, Wendt became the chargé d'affaires ad interim at the newly established U.S. Embassy in Ljubljana, Slovenia. On May 15, 1993, he was appointed by President Clinton to become the U.S. Ambassador to Slovenia, and he presented his credentials on May 26, 1993. He was superseded on September 12, 1995.

Wendt holds a Master of Public Administration (economics) from Harvard, a Certificat d’Etudes Politiques from the Institut d’Etudes Politiques in Paris, and a BA magna cum laude from Yale.

References

External links
 United States Department of State: Chiefs of Mission for Slovenia
 United States Department of State: Slovenia
 United States Embassy in Ljubljana

  
Ambassadors of the United States to Slovenia
1935 births
Living people
Harvard Kennedy School alumni
United States Foreign Service personnel
Yale University alumni